is a Japanese march composed by Tōkichi Setoguchi with lyrics by Yukio Morikawa.  It was released in December 1937.

History 
At the outbreak of the Second Sino-Japanese War, the Cabinet of Japan sponsored several public competitions for lyrics to Aikoku Kōshinkyoku in September 1937.  There were 57,578 entries for lyrics that were received, and Morikawa's entry was selected as the winner.  For the music, 9,555 entries to accompany the lyrics were then received, and Setoguchi was declared the winner. Setoguchi was already a noted composer who had written the Gunkan kōshinkyoku, the official march of the Imperial Navy.

A few days after its release, Aikoku Kōshinkyoku sold a hundred thousand copies from six labels.  It sold over a million by 1938.

In popular culture 
This song is used in the 1972 Malaysian film Laksamana Do Re Mi, but with different lyrics.

Lyrics

References 

1937 songs
Japanese-language songs
Japanese military marches
Japanese patriotic songs